In modular arithmetic, the integers coprime (relatively prime) to n from the set  of n non-negative integers form a group under multiplication modulo n, called the multiplicative group of integers modulo n.  Equivalently, the elements of this group can be thought of as the congruence classes, also known as residues modulo n, that are coprime to n.
Hence another name is the group of primitive residue classes modulo n.
In the theory of rings, a branch of abstract algebra, it is described as the group of units of the ring of integers modulo n. Here units refers to elements with a multiplicative inverse, which, in this ring, are exactly those coprime to n.

This quotient group, usually denoted , is fundamental in number theory. It is used in cryptography, integer factorization, and primality testing.  It is an abelian, finite group whose order is given by Euler's totient function:   For prime n the group is cyclic and in general the structure is easy to describe, though even for prime n no general formula for finding generators is known.

Group axioms
It is a straightforward exercise to show that, under multiplication, the set of congruence classes modulo n that are coprime to n satisfy the axioms for an abelian group.

Indeed, a is coprime to n if and only if . Integers in the same congruence class  satisfy , hence one is coprime to n if and only if the other is. Thus the notion of congruence classes modulo n that are coprime to n is well-defined.

Since  and  implies , the set of classes coprime to n is closed under multiplication.

Integer multiplication respects the congruence classes, that is,  and  implies .
This implies that the multiplication is associative, commutative, and that the class of 1 is the unique multiplicative identity.

Finally, given a, the multiplicative inverse of a modulo n is an integer x satisfying .
It exists precisely when a is coprime to n, because in that case  and by Bézout's lemma there are integers x and y satisfying . Notice that the equation  implies that x is coprime to n, so the multiplicative inverse belongs to the group.

Notation
The set of (congruence classes of) integers modulo n with the operations of addition and multiplication is a ring.
It is denoted   or    (the notation refers to taking the quotient of integers modulo the ideal  or  consisting of the multiples of n).
Outside of number theory the simpler notation  is often used, though it can be confused with the -adic integers when n is a prime number.

The multiplicative group of integers modulo n, which is the group of units in this ring, may be written as (depending on the author)             (for German Einheit, which translates as unit), or similar notations. This article uses 

The notation  refers to the cyclic group of order n.
It is isomorphic to the group of integers modulo n under addition.
Note that  or  may also refer to the group under addition.
For example, the multiplicative group  for a prime p is cyclic and hence isomorphic to the additive group , but the isomorphism is not obvious.

Structure
The order of the multiplicative group of integers modulo n is the number of integers in  coprime to n.
It is given by Euler's totient function:  .
For prime p, .

Cyclic case

For all other values of n the group is not cyclic.
This was first proved by Gauss.

This means that for these n:
 where 

By definition, the group is cyclic if and only if it has a generator g (a generating set {g} of size one), that is, the powers  give all possible residues modulo n coprime to n (the first  powers  give each exactly once).

Powers of 2
Modulo 1 any two integers are congruent, i.e., there is only one congruence class, [0], coprime to 1. Therefore,  is the trivial group with  element. Because of its trivial nature, the case of congruences modulo 1 is generally ignored and some authors choose not to include the case of n = 1 in theorem statements.

Modulo 2 there is only one coprime congruence class, [1], so  is the trivial group.

Modulo 4 there are two coprime congruence classes, [1] and [3], so  the cyclic group with two elements.

Modulo 8 there are four coprime congruence classes, [1], [3], [5] and [7]. The square of each of these is 1, so  the Klein four-group.

Modulo 16 there are eight coprime congruence classes [1], [3], [5], [7], [9], [11], [13] and [15].  is the 2-torsion subgroup (i.e., the square of each element is 1), so  is not cyclic. The powers of 3,  are a subgroup of order 4, as are the powers of 5,     Thus 

The pattern shown by 8 and 16 holds for higher powers  2k, :  is the 2-torsion subgroup (so  is not cyclic) and the powers of 3 are a cyclic subgroup of order , so

General composite numbers
By the fundamental theorem of finite abelian groups, the group  is isomorphic to a direct product of cyclic groups of prime power orders.

More specifically, the Chinese remainder theorem says that if   then the ring  is the direct product of the rings corresponding to each of its prime power factors:

Similarly, the group of units  is the direct product of the groups corresponding to each of the prime power factors:

For each odd prime power  the corresponding factor  is the cyclic group of order , which may further factor into cyclic groups of prime-power orders.
For powers of 2 the factor  is not cyclic unless k = 0, 1, 2, but factors into cyclic groups as described above.

The order of the group  is the product of the orders of the cyclic groups in the direct product.
The exponent of the group, that is, the least common multiple of the orders in the cyclic groups, is given by the Carmichael function  .
In other words,  is the smallest number such that for each a coprime to n,  holds.
It divides  and is equal to it if and only if the group is cyclic.

Subgroup of false witnesses
If n is composite, there exists a subgroup of the multiplicative group, called the "group of false witnesses", in which the elements, when raised to the power , are congruent to 1 modulo n. (Because the residue 1 when raised to any power is congruent to 1 modulo n, the set of such elements is nonempty.)  One could say, because of Fermat's Little Theorem, that such residues are "false positives" or "false witnesses" for the primality of n. The number 2 is the residue most often used in this basic primality check, hence  is famous since 2340 is congruent to 1 modulo 341, and 341 is the smallest such composite number (with respect to 2). For 341, the false witnesses subgroup contains 100 residues and so is of index 3 inside the 300 element multiplicative group mod 341.

Examples

n = 9
There are 6 residues coprime to 9: 1, 2, 4, 5, 7, 8. So 1 and 8 are false positives for the "primality" of 9 (since 9 is not actually prime). These are in fact the only ones, so the subgroup {1,8} is the subgroup of false witnesses. The same argument shows that  is a "false witness" for any odd composite n.

n = 91
For n = 91 (= 7 × 13), there are  residues coprime to 91, half of them (i.e., 36 of them) are false witnesses of 91, namely 1, 3, 4, 9, 10, 12, 16, 17, 22, 23, 25, 27, 29, 30, 36, 38, 40, 43, 48, 51, 53, 55, 61, 62, 64, 66, 68, 69, 74, 75, 79, 81, 82, 87, 88, and 90, since for these values of x, x90 is congruent to 1 mod 91.

n = 561
n = 561 (= 3 × 11 × 17) is a Carmichael number, thus s560 is congruent to 1 modulo 561 for any integer s coprime to 561. The subgroup of false witnesses is, in this case, not proper; it is the entire group of multiplicative units modulo 561, which consists of 320 residues.

Examples

The decomposition and generating sets are not unique; for example, 

 

(but ). The table below lists the shortest decomposition (among those, the lexicographically first is chosen – this guarantees isomorphic groups are listed with the same decompositions). The generating set is also chosen to be as short as possible, and for n with primitive root, the smallest primitive root modulo n is listed.

For example, take . Then  means that the order of the group is 8 (i.e., there are 8 numbers less than 20 and coprime to it);  means the order of each element divides 4, that is, the fourth power of any number coprime to 20 is congruent to 1 (mod 20).

Smallest primitive root mod n are (0 if no root exists)
0, 1, 2, 3, 2, 5, 3, 0, 2, 3, 2, 0, 2, 3, 0, 0, 3, 5, 2, 0, 0, 7, 5, 0, 2, 7, 2, 0, 2, 0, 3, 0, 0, 3, 0, 0, 2, 3, 0, 0, 6, 0, 3, 0, 0, 5, 5, 0, 3, 3, 0, 0, 2, 5, 0, 0, 0, 3, 2, 0, 2, 3, 0, 0, 0, 0, 2, 0, 0, 0, 7, 0, 5, 5, 0, 0, 0, 0, 3, 0, 2, 7, 2, 0, 0, 3, 0, 0, 3, 0, ... 

Numbers of the elements in a minimal generating set of mod n are
0, 0, 1, 1, 1, 1, 1, 2, 1, 1, 1, 2, 1, 1, 2, 2, 1, 1, 1, 2, 2, 1, 1, 3, 1, 1, 1, 2, 1, 2, 1, 2, 2, 1, 2, 2, 1, 1, 2, 3, 1, 2, 1, 2, 2, 1, 1, 3, 1, 1, 2, 2, 1, 1, 2, 3, 2, 1, 1, 3, 1, 1, 2, 2, 2, 2, 1, 2, 2, 2, 1, 3, 1, 1, 2, 2, 2, 2, 1, 3, 1, 1, 1, 3, 2, 1, 2, 3, 1, 2, ...

See also

 Lenstra elliptic curve factorization

Notes

References

The Disquisitiones Arithmeticae has been translated from Gauss's Ciceronian Latin into English and German. The German edition includes all of his papers on number theory: all the proofs of quadratic reciprocity, the determination of the sign of the Gauss sum, the investigations into biquadratic reciprocity, and unpublished notes.

External links

Web-based tool to interactively compute group tables by John Jones

Finite groups
Modular arithmetic
Multiplication